Saccharopolyspora cavernae is a Gram-positive, aerobic and non-motile bacterium from the genus of Saccharopolyspora which has been isolated from cave-wall soil from the Swallow Cave, Yunnan Province, China.

References

 

Pseudonocardineae
Bacteria described in 2014